Mary Rose Barrington (31 January 1926 – 20 February 2020) was a British parapsychologist, barrister and charity administrator.

She was President of the Oxford University Society for Psychical Research, and joined the Society for Psychical Research in 1957, becoming a Council member in 1962. She served on its Spontaneous Cases Committee since the beginning of the committee. In 1995 she was elected as Vice-President of the Society.

Outside of her parapsychology work, she supported animal protection and voluntary euthanasia. She was once a chairperson of the British Voluntary Euthanasia Society. She appeared in the episode Ripples in Time of the British paranormal documentary television series Ghosthunters.

Partial bibliography
A World In A Grain Of Sand: The Clairvoyance Of Stefan Ossowiecki, by Ian Stevenson, Zofia Weaver, and Mary Rose Barrington, (2005).  
Beyond The Boggle Threshold: Confessions Of A Macro-Addict, in Men and Women of Parapsychology, Personal Reflections, ESPRIT Volume 2, edited by Rosemarie Pilkington, (2013).  
Swan on a Black Sea: How Much Could Miss Cummins Have Known?. (1966). Journal of the Society for Psychical Research. Mary Rose Barrington. Volume 43. pp. 289–300. 
"Apologia for Suicide," by Mary Rose Barrington, in "Suicide, The Philosophical Issues", edited by M. Pabst Battin and David l. Mayo. New York: St. Martins Press. 1981.

References

1926 births
2020 deaths
Place of birth missing
Parapsychologists
British psychologists
British barristers